The  was the ninth season having a fourth-tier status in Japanese football, and the 24th season since the establishment of Japan Football League. The slogan for this season was "Enchant with a different play!" The matches were mostly broadcast/streamed live at Japan Football League's channel. The league's awards, not held since 2020 due to special measures regarding COVID-19, was held on 6 December 2022.

League structure and organisation
Iwaki FC won the league for the first time in their history, after joining the league only two seasons ago. So, they were promoted and joined J3 for the 2022 season. Then, sixteen clubs featured in this season of Japan Football League. FC Kariya were relegated after losing the playoff against Criacao Shinjuku, who were duly promoted to the JFL after qualifying in the top two spots of the 45th Regional Play-off Series. Honda Lock kept their stay at JFL, as despite having finished 16th last season, they won their playoff match against FC Ise-Shima to avoid relegation to the Regional Leagues. 

As of November 2022, there were six teams eligible for promotion to the J3 League, as the only way teams from JFL can be promoted to the J3, is by having a license (the same applies for teams being promoted from J3 to J2, and from J2 to J1). Up from none to 2 teams could be promoted from the Japan Football League, or relegated to the Regional Leagues, depending on the circumstances.

The league is played under a round-robin format, with the 16 teams playing home-and-away matches against each other, playing in total 30 matches across the competition, starting from 13 March and ending on 20 November.  It features the usual point-earning format, with 3 points for winning, 1 for drawing, and no points for losing.

Regarding the breaks during the match, because of the COVID-19 pandemic, the JFL continued to follow FIFA's recommendation of a maximum of 5 available substitutions, and 3 substitution windows per team in each match (excluding the half-time). The teams are allowed a water break at each half of the matches regardless of the WBGT on the matchday. The decision to have or not to have a water break is up to whose teams are playing the match.

Participating clubs
The teams which possess promotion-enabler licenses are highlighted in green in the following table.

Personnel and kits

Foreign players

League table

Nara Club and FC Osaka have been promoted to J3 League, so there will be no relegation from the 2022 JFL.

Season statistics

Top scorers
.

Hat-tricks 
As of 20 November 2022.

Awards
The awards were announced and presented on 6 December 2022.

Team awards

Individual Awards

Team of the Year

See also

Japan Football Association (JFA)
League
Japanese association football league system
J.League
2022 J1 League (Tier 1)
2022 J2 League (Tier 2)
2022 J3 League (Tier 3)
2022 Regional Champions League (JFL promotion/relegation play-offs)
2022 Regional Leagues (Tier 5/6)
Cup(s)
2022 Fujifilm Super Cup (Super Cup)
2022 Emperor's Cup (National Open Cup)
2022 J.League YBC Levain Cup (League Cup)

References

External links
Official website 

Japan Football League seasons
4